The women's individual compound competition at the 2015 World Archery Championships took place from 27 July to 1 August 2015 in Copenhagen, Denmark.

Schedule
All times are local (UTC+01:00).

Qualification round
Pre-tournament world rankings ('WR') are taken from the 18 July 2015 World Archery Rankings.

 Bye to third round 
 Qualified for eliminations

Elimination rounds

Top half

Section 1

Section 2

Section 3

Section 4

Bottom half

Section 5

Section 6

Section 7

Section 8

Finals

References

2015 World Archery Championships
World